United Nations Security Council resolution 468, adopted on 8 May 1980, after recalling the Geneva Conventions, the council expressed its concern regarding the expulsion of the mayors of Hebron and Halhoul, as well as the Sharia judge of Hebron by occupying Israeli forces.

The resolution called upon Israel to rescind the "illegal measures" and to facilitate the return of the individuals concerned to resume the functions they were elected or appointed to do. The council also requested the secretary-general to continually monitor the implementation of the resolution.

Resolution 468 was adopted with 14 votes to none, and one abstention from the United States.

See also
 Israeli–Palestinian conflict
 List of United Nations Security Council Resolutions 401 to 500 (1976–1982)

References
Text of the Resolution at undocs.org

External links
 

 0468
 0468
Israeli–Palestinian conflict and the United Nations
1980 in Israel
May 1980 events